Rodrigo Vieira Heffner (born September 8, 1982, in Porto Alegre), known as Rodrigo Heffner, is a Brazilian footballer who currently plays for Santo André as right back.

Career
He signed a contract until the end of the 2011 season with Naútico.

Career statistics
(Correct )

Honours
Grêmio
Campeonato Gaúcho: 2001

Suzano
Campeonato Paulista Série A2: 2003

Barueri
Campeonato Paulista Série A3: 2005

Coritiba
Campeonato Paranaense: 2010

External links
 Rodrigo Heffner at oGol 
 
 

1982 births
Living people
Campeonato Brasileiro Série A players
Coritiba Foot Ball Club players
Guarani FC players
Clube Náutico Capibaribe players
América Futebol Clube (MG) players
Esporte Clube Santo André players
Brazilian footballers
Brazilian people of German descent
Association football defenders
Footballers from Porto Alegre